Houston Lighting & Power Co. (HL&P), later named Reliant Energy HL&P/Entex, was the single power and utility company that served Greater Houston of the U.S. state of Texas. It was a subsidiary of Houston Industries (HI, NYSE: HOU), which later was renamed to Reliant Energy (REI). In 1998 in terms of kilowatt-hour sales it was the tenth-largest energy company in the United States.

History

It began operations in 1882.

In 1999 Houston Industries changed its name to Reliant Energy. Therefore HL&P was renamed Reliant Energy HL&P/Entex.

When the state of Texas deregulated the electricity market, HL&P was split into several companies. In 2003 the company was split into Reliant Energy, Texas Genco, and CenterPoint Energy. Texas Genco assumed control of the area's power plants. CenterPoint assumed control of the poles and power lines. Reliant Energy took over the sales of electricity to businesses and individuals.

Offices

Before the dissolution of the company, its headquarters were shared with Houston Industries in the Houston Industries Plaza, now the CenterPoint Energy Plaza in Downtown Houston.

The Bob Lanier Public Works Building in Downtown Houston, formerly the Electric Building, was previously the HL&P office building. In 1999 the City of Houston, which had acquired the building, renovated it for $43 million to house city government offices.

References

Further reading
 "Parent firms of HL&P and Entex to merge." Houston Chronicle.
 "Houston Industries bid looks to the future." Houston Chronicle.
 "NorAm played it safe to be #3 gas firm." Houston Chronicle.

External links
 
 

1882 establishments in Texas
1999 disestablishments in Texas
Companies based in Houston
Defunct companies based in Texas
Defunct electric power companies of the United States
Energy companies disestablished in 1999
Energy companies established in 1882
American companies disestablished in 1999
American companies established in 1882
Defunct energy companies of the United States